Nikola Leković (Serbian Cyrillic: Никола Лековић; born 19 December 1989) is a Serbian professional footballer who plays as a left-back for Mladost Lučani.

Club career
Born in Belgrade, Leković started out at Partizan as a trainee in 1998. He spent nine years in the club's youth setup, before switching to Bežanija in 2007. After initially playing for their youth team, Leković was promoted to the senior squad in May 2008, making his Serbian SuperLiga debut in a 0–1 home loss to Hajduk Kula. He spent two more seasons at the club, as the side competed in the Serbian First League, before securing a transfer to Rad in the summer of 2010. Over the following three seasons at Banjica, Leković made 88 appearances in all competitions.

In July 2013, Leković was transferred to Vojvodina on a two-year contract plus a one-year option. He scored a goal in the 90th minute of a 1–2 away loss against Moldovan champions Sheriff Tiraspol in the 2013–14 UEFA Europa League play-off round, as Vojvodina were eliminated. In February 2014, Leković moved abroad and signed with Polish club Lechia Gdańsk.

On 31 August 2015, Leković joined his parent club Partizan on a season-long loan from Lechia Gdańsk. He was given the number 3 shirt, previously worn by Vladimir Volkov. After becoming a free agent, Leković agreed terms with Napredak Kruševac in July 2016.

In January 2017, Leković moved abroad for the second time and signed with Belarusian club Dinamo Minsk. After Dinamo, he also played for Kerkyra and Karabükspor during 2018, and for Mladost Lučani from 2018 to 2019.

On 30 December 2019, Leković signed a two and a half year contract with Bosnian Premier League club Tuzla City. He made his official debut for Tuzla City in a 6–2 league loss against Sarajevo on 22 February 2020. On 24 June 2020, Leković decided to terminate his contract and leave Tuzla City.

International career
Leković represented Serbia at under-21 level, making two appearances in the team's unsuccessful qualifiers for the 2011 UEFA Under-21 Championship.

Career statistics

Club

Honours
Partizan
Serbian Cup: 2015–16

References

External links

1989 births
Living people
Footballers from Belgrade
Serbian footballers
Serbian expatriate footballers
Expatriate footballers in Poland
Expatriate footballers in Belarus
Expatriate footballers in Greece
Expatriate footballers in Turkey
Expatriate footballers in Bosnia and Herzegovina
Serbian expatriate sportspeople in Poland
Serbian expatriate sportspeople in Belarus
Serbian expatriate sportspeople in Greece
Serbian expatriate sportspeople in Turkey
Serbian expatriate sportspeople in Bosnia and Herzegovina
Serbian SuperLiga players
Serbian First League players
Ekstraklasa players
Belarusian Premier League players
Super League Greece players
TFF First League players
Premier League of Bosnia and Herzegovina players
FK Bežanija players
FK Rad players
FK Vojvodina players
Lechia Gdańsk players
FK Partizan players
FK Napredak Kruševac players
FC Dinamo Minsk players
PAE Kerkyra players
FK Mladost Lučani players
FK Tuzla City players
Serbia under-21 international footballers
Association football defenders